The 2010 Big East Conference baseball tournament was held from May 23 to May 27 at Bright House Field in Clearwater, Florida. It was an eight-team double elimination tournament. The winner, received a bid to the 2010 NCAA Division I baseball tournament.

Format and seeding 
The top eight teams in the Big East were seeded one through eight based on their regular season finish, using conference winning percentage only.

Bracket

All-Tournament Team 
The following players were named to the All-Tournament Team.

Jack Kaiser Award 
Kyle Hansen was the winner of the 2010 Jack Kaiser Award. Hansen was a pitcher for St. John's.

References 

Tournament
Big East Conference Baseball Tournament
Big East Conference baseball tournament
Big East Conference baseball tournament
College baseball tournaments in Florida
Baseball competitions in Clearwater, Florida